"Ring a Ring o' Roses", "Ring a Ring o' Rosie", or (in the United States) "Ring Around the Rosie", is a nursery rhyme, folk song and playground singing game. Descriptions first emerge in the mid-19th century, but are reported as dating from decades before, and similar rhymes are known from across Europe. It has a Roud Folk Song Index number of 7925.

The lyrics vary, but a modern interpretation based on modern lyrics that related the words to the plague in England became widespread post-WWII, even though it appears to be a false folk etymology.

Lyrics

It is unknown what the earliest wording of the rhyme was or when it began. Many versions of the game have a group of children form a ring, dance in a circle around a person, and stoop or curtsy with the final line. The slowest child to do so is faced with a penalty or becomes the "rosie" (literally: rose tree, from the French rosier) and takes their place in the center of the ring.

Common British versions include:

Common American versions include:

Some versions replace the third line with "Red Bird Blue Bird", "Green Grass-Yellow Grass" or substitute as ending "Sweet bread, rye bread,/ Squat!" Godey's Lady's Book (1882) explains what happens here, giving the variation as "One, two, three—squat!" Before the last line, the children stop suddenly, then exclaim it together, "suiting the action to the word with unfailing hilarity and complete satisfaction".

Common Indian versions end with: "Husha busha!/ We all fall down!"

Early attestation

Variations, corruptions, and vulgarized versions were noted to be in use long before the earliest printed publications. One such variation was dated to be in use in Connecticut in the 1840s. A novel of 1855, The Old Homestead by Ann S. Stephens, records the variation

Another early record of the rhyme was in Kate Greenaway's Mother Goose; or, the Old Nursery Rhymes (1881):

In his Games and Songs of American Children (1883), William Wells Newell reports several variants, one of which he provides with a melody and dates to New Bedford, Massachusetts around 1790:

Newell writes that "[a]t the end of the words the children suddenly stoop, and the last to get down undergoes some penalty, or has to take the place of the child in the centre, who represents the 'rosie' (rose-tree; French, rosier)." A different penalty was recorded in an 1846 article from the Brooklyn Eagle describing the game named Ring o' Roses. A group of young children form a ring, from which a boy takes out a girl and kisses her.

An 1883 collection of Shropshire folk-lore includes the following version:

On the last line "they stand and imitate sneezing". In their Dictionary of Nursery Rhymes the Opies record similar variations over time.

European variants

A German rhyme first printed in 1796 closely resembles "Ring a ring o' roses" in its first stanza and accompanies the same actions (with sitting rather than falling as the concluding action):

Loosely translated this says: "Round about in rings / We children three/ Sit beneath an elderbush / And 'Shoo, shoo, shoo' go we!" The rhyme (as in the popular collection Des Knaben Wunderhorn) is well known in Germany and has many local variants.

Another German version runs:

– in translation: "A ring, a ring o' roses,/ Lovely apricots,/ Violets blue, forget-me-nots,/ Sit down, children all!"

Swiss versions have the children dancing round a rosebush. Other European singing games with a strong resemblance include "Roze, roze, meie" ("Rose, rose, May") from The Netherlands with a similar tune to "Ring a ring o' roses" and "Gira, gira rosa" ("Circle, circle, rose"), recorded in Venice in 1874, in which girls danced around the girl in the middle who skipped and curtsied as demanded by the verses and at the end kissed the one she liked best, so choosing her for the middle.

Paintings
Evidence of similar children's round-dances appears in continental paintings. For example, Hans Thoma's Kinderreigen  (children dancing in a ring)  of 1872 takes place in an Alpine meadow, while his later version of the game has the children dancing round a tree. The Florentine Raffaello Sorbi transported the scene to the Renaissance in his 1877 Girotondo (Round-dance), in which young maidens circle a child at the center to an instrumental accompaniment. 

The words to which these children danced are not referred to, but their opening is quoted by the English artists who pictured similar scenes in the 19th century. In Thomas Webster's "Ring o' Roses" of about 1850 the children dance to the music of a seated clarinetist, while in Frederick Morgan's "Ring a Ring of Roses" (the title under which it was exhibited at the Royal Academy Summer Exhibition in 1885) the children dance around a tree. Two other artists connected with the Newlyn School also depicted the game: Elizabeth Adela Forbes in 1880 and Harold Harvey later.

Provenance

The origins and meanings of the game have long been unknown and subject to speculation. Folklore scholars, however, regard the Great Plague explanation, that has been the most common since the mid-20th century, as baseless.

Theories from the late 19th century
In 1898, A Dictionary of British Folklore contained the belief that an explanation of the game was of pagan origin, based on the Sheffield Glossary comparison of Jacob Grimm's Deutsche Mythologie. The theory states that it is in reference to Pagan myths and cited a passage which states, "Gifted children of fortune have the power to laugh roses, as Freyja wept gold." It claimed the first instance to be indicative of pagan beings of light. Another suggestion is more literal, that it was making a "ring" around the roses and bowing with the "all fall down" as a curtsy. In 1892, the American writer, Eugene Field wrote a poem titled Teeny-Weeny that specifically referred to fay folk playing ring-a-rosie.

According to Games and Songs of American Children, published in 1883, the "rosie" was a reference to the French word for rose tree and the children would dance and stoop to the person in the center. Variations, especially more literal ones, were identified and noted with the literal falling down that would sever the connections to the game-rhyme. Again in 1898, sneezing was then noted to be indicative of many superstitious and supernatural beliefs across differing cultures.

The Great Plague explanation of the mid-20th century
Since after the Second World War, the rhyme has often been associated with the Great Plague which happened in England in 1665, or with earlier outbreaks of the bubonic plague in England. Interpreters of the rhyme before World War II make no mention of this; by 1951, however, it seems to have become well established as an explanation for the form of the rhyme that had become standard in the United Kingdom. Peter and Iona Opie, the leading authorities on nursery rhymes, remarked:

The line Ashes, Ashes in colonial versions of the rhyme is claimed to refer variously to cremation of the bodies, the burning of victims' houses, or blackening of their skin, and the theory has been adapted to be applied to other versions of the rhyme.

In its various forms, the interpretation has entered into popular culture and has been used elsewhere to make oblique reference to the plague. In 1949, a parodist composed a version alluding to radiation sickness:

In March 2020, during the early stages of the COVID-19 pandemic in the United Kingdom, the traditional rhyme was jokingly proposed as the "ideal choice" of song to accompany hand-washing in order to ward off infection.

Counterarguments
Folklore scholars regard the Great Plague explanation of the rhyme as baseless for several reasons:
The plague explanation did not appear until the mid-twentieth century.
The symptoms described do not fit especially well with the Great Plague.
The great variety of forms makes it unlikely that the modern form is the most ancient one, and the words on which the interpretation are based are not found in many of the earliest records of the rhyme (see above).
European and 19th-century versions of the rhyme suggest that this "fall" was not a literal falling down, but a curtsy or other form of bending movement that was common in other dramatic singing games.

References

Citations

General sources 
 
 
 
 
 
 

1790s in England
1881 songs
1881 in England
English folk songs
English children's songs
Singing games
Urban legends
Traditional children's songs
English nursery rhymes